Derek McLean (born 21 December 1932) was a professional footballer who played for Middlesbrough and Hartlepool United.

References

Middlesbrough F.C. players
Living people
1932 births
People from Redcar and Cleveland
Hartlepool United F.C. players
Association football forwards
English footballers